101 (pronounced ) is an American slang term for the most basic knowledge in some subject, as in "boiling potatoes is cooking 101".

History

The slang sense of the number "101" originates from its frequent use in US college course numbering systems to indicate the first or introductory course in some topic of study, such as "Calculus 101" or "French 101".

An early use of "101" in this sense occurs in a catalog from the University at Buffalo in 1929.  The Oxford English Dictionary records a use of "101" in the general slang sense from 1986.

References

External links

 How to Read a Course Description at Boise State University

Academic slang
Educational practices